The First Arthur County Courthouse and Jail, was perhaps the smallest court house in the United States, and serves now as a museum.

Located at Marshall St. between Fir and Elm Sts. in Arthur, Nebraska, the  courthouse building was built in 1914, and the jail was built in 1915, as the first government buildings in newly formed Arthur County.  The courthouse was designed by a J.S. Noll with some elements of Italianate style.  The property was listed on the National Register of Historic Places in 1990; the listing included two contributing buildings.

References

External links 
More photos of the First Arthur County Courthouse and Jail at Wikimedia Commons

Courthouses on the National Register of Historic Places in Nebraska
Italianate architecture in Nebraska
Government buildings completed in 1914
County courthouses in Nebraska
Historic districts on the National Register of Historic Places in Nebraska
National Register of Historic Places in Arthur County, Nebraska
Jails on the National Register of Historic Places in Nebraska
1914 establishments in Nebraska